Stanhopea oculata is a species of orchid occurring from Mexico to Colombia and southeastern Brazil.

References

External links 

oculata
Orchids of Central America
Orchids of Belize
Orchids of Brazil
Orchids of Colombia
Orchids of Mexico